Rivella is a soft drink from Switzerland, created by Robert Barth in 1952, which is produced from milk whey, and therefore includes ingredients such as lactose, lactic acid and minerals. Other than Switzerland, it is sold in several other countries, notably the Netherlands, and is available in several varieties depending on the country.

History
In 1950 Roberth Barth and the biologist Hans Süsli Zurich used a recipe initially conceived to produce a beer made with whey to create a soft drink, which came to be marketed as Rivella Red in 1952, when Rivella AG was founded. The name Rivella was inspired by the municipality of Riva San Vitale in Canton Ticino and the Italian word for "revelation", rivelazione. The initial production began in Stäfa before moving to Rothrist, where it remains to this day. Second variety of Rivella was launched in 1958 in the Netherlands and in 1959 in Switzerland, known as Rivella Blue, a lower calorie alternative to the original recipe. It was the first diet soft drink to be launched in Europe. A third variety, Rivella Green, was launched in 1999 made with green tea extract, and Rivella Yellow, made with soy milk as an alternative to milk whey, in 2008.

In 2000 the presidency was passed on from Robert Barth to his son Alexander Barth, before the death of Robert Barth in 2007.

Until 2008, Swiss supermarket chain Migros stocked an own-brand version of the beverage called Mivella, which was made by Rivella specifically for the supermarket. In 2008, Migros replaced it with Rivella as it did not enjoy the same popularity among customers as the original drink. In February 2022, in a further attempt to compete with Rivella, Migros revived the competitor drink "Prego", which dates back to 1956 when it was created by Robert Schlör.

In 1977 Rivella began sponsoring the Swiss National Ski team. In 2017 they celebrated 40 years of partnership in St. Moritz.

Ingredients

The ingredients of Rivella Red are as follows:

 Water
 Milk whey (35%)
 Sugar 
 Carbonic acid 
 Acidity regulator (L(+)-Lactic Acid)
 Acidifier (L(+)-Lactic Acid)
 Caramelised sugar
 Natural flavourings
 Rivella Red contains 160 kJ of energy (approx. 37 kcal) per 100 ml as 10g of sugar.
 Rivella Blue contains 14 grams of lactose and artificial sweeteners (cyclamate, acesulfame K) instead of refined sugar. This reduces the energy content to 30 kJ (approx. 7 kcal) per 100 ml.
 Rivella Green Tea also contains green tea extracts (0.05%). Its energy content is 90 kJ (approx. 22 kcal) per 100 ml.

Varieties

Dutch varieties of Rivella:
 Rivella Original
 Rivella Green Tea
 Rivella Cranberry
 Rivella Pineapple
 Rivella Raspberry

Availability

Rivella is seen as Switzerland's national beverage. The share by value of Rivella AG in the Swiss soft drinks market was 15.3 per cent in 2013, putting Rivella second to Coca-Cola.
Rivella is a long-established brand in the Principality of Liechtenstein, the Netherlands and Luxembourg. Rivella Light was launched as a diabetic beverage in the Netherlands in 1958. It appeared on the Swiss market one year later (1959) as Rivella Blue. The Netherlands remains the largest foreign market for Rivella. Rivella is also available in the regions bordering Switzerland in Germany, France and Austria.
Rivella beverages available abroad are made to the same recipe as in Switzerland except the Netherlands, where beverages are made by Rivella licensing partner Vrumona using concentrate supplied by Rivella.

Rivella was available in stores in the United States, but it is no longer available in that way. American customers can still order it online.

See also 
 Culinary Heritage of Switzerland

References

External links

Rivella Official website

Soft drinks
Culinary Heritage of Switzerland
Swiss brands
Swiss drinks
Products introduced in 1952